Berryville is a former independent community in Morgan County in the U.S. state of West Virginia. Located south of downtown Berkeley Springs, Berryville sprouted up along U.S. Route 522 at the beginning of the 20th century; first as a farming community and then as a residential extension of a growing Berkeley Springs. It remains outside the Bath town limits. Berryville includes Berkeley Springs High School, Widmyer Elementary School, and Greenway Cemetery.

References 

Unincorporated communities in Morgan County, West Virginia
Unincorporated communities in West Virginia